is a Japanese anime series produced by AIC. The series is the 6th installment of the Tenchi Muyo! franchise and is sponsored by the city of Takahashi, Okayama in order to promote tourism for the city, and several new characters are based upon the legend of Momotarō and his companions.  It was also created to commemorate the franchise's 20th anniversary and a revival project.  The anime series aired on Tokyo MX beginning in October 2014, and consisted of 60 four-minute episodes.  The series was directed by Hiroshi Negishi, who previously directed Tenchi Universe and its two sequel films (Tenchi Muyo in Love and Tenchi Forever!), with Suzuhito Yasuda providing the new, updated character designs. Many of the voice actors from the original franchise returned, with the exception of Ayeka, who is now played by Haruhi Nanao.  Negishi has stated that the plot is adapted from an unproduced sequel to Tenchi Forever!, though the absence of the character Kiyone Makibi makes continuity with Tenchi Universe dubious.

Plot
In this story, the world is in chaos, thanks to Washu. Now in order to save it, Tenchi Masaki must go undercover as a student teacher at an all-girls school. Unfortunately for him, trouble always comes his way as he has a hard time dealing with the hijinks of his new students.

Characters

Masaki Household

Now 22 years old, Tenchi is assigned as a student teacher in an all-girls school for a secret mission.

A former space pirate, she reformed upon meeting Tenchi and the others and moved to his house.

A princess of the Jurai Royal Family, usually competes with Ryoko for Tenchi's attention.

Now a teenager, Sasami is also a princess of Jurai and Ayeka's younger sister.

A detective of the Galaxy Police, Mihoshi is prone to clumsiness and can act ditsy, despite being highly intelligent.

A former director of the Galaxy Academy and ranked as the top scientist in the universe.  She is the one who asks Tenchi to infiltrate the school.

Student Council

The main female protagonist and the school's student council president. She is straight-forward and honest and has a strong sense of justice. Unbeknownst to her (currently), she is a temporally-displaced princess of the Jurai Royal Family.

The student council's enforcer. She's chivalrous, spirited, and fundamentally brave. She's overprotective of Momo and to her anyone who gets close to Momo is an enemy. She is brave and strong while fighting with her wooden sword, but cries in despair upon losing it.

The student council's accountant. Contrary to her outward flirtatiousness, she's an aikido master and Yuri enthusiast. She has a broad outlook and is good at reading the atmosphere.

The student council's clerk. She's brilliant and keeps her calm no matter what the situation is, except for her infatuation with Sasami. Her grades are number one in the school.

Science Club

The club president of the science club. She's quick-tempered and unyielding. She searches for treasure around the school for an unknown party, leading them to butt heads with the student council over securing resources with which to do it.

A shy and weak member of the science club. She's tall, well endowed, and a big eater. She and Yuki are childhood friends and are therefore, unfortunately for Rui, often together.

The bodyguard of the school science club. She's taciturn, brave, and confident. She has superhuman strength like an ogre. She is suspicious of Tenchi and think he is hiding a secret.

Other Characters

Tenchi's mentor as a teacher, who offers him guidance.  It is revealed later that she works for the Galaxy Police.

Media

Anime

Manga
A manga adaptation, written and illustrated by Haruna Nakazato, debuted in Kodansha's Monthly Shōnen Sirius on November 26, 2014, and ran until October 26, 2015.

References

External links 

Official anime website 

2014 Japanese television series endings
Anime International Company
Comedy anime and manga
Funimation
Harem anime and manga
Kodansha manga
Shōnen manga
Television series about princesses
Tenchi Muyo!
Tokyo MX original programming